George Wynden Levis (November 22, 1894 – October 8, 1980) was an American college basketball player and coach during the 1910s and 1920s, respectively. He was a two-time All-American as a player while at Wisconsin from 1912–13 to 1915–16, and was also the Helms Foundation National Player of the Year as a senior in 1915–16. A native of Madison, Wisconsin, Levis decided to stay in his hometown for college, and while enrolled he also played on the school's baseball team.

Levis played the forward position and helped lead the Badgers to a 20–1 overall record and the Big Ten Conference championship in 1915–16, and that season would also see them retroactively declared as national champions by the Helms Foundation. Levis also led the conference in scoring as a senior: in 12 Big Ten contests he scored 109 points, which was unusual for an era of basketball in which low-scoring games were standard.

Levis was graduated from the University of Wisconsin in 1916. In 1920, Levis became the head basketball coach at Indiana. He spent two seasons guiding the Hoosiers and compiled an overall record of 25–16, including a 9–12 record in conference play. He was set to start his third season as coach in 1922–23 but resigned during the preseason in order to work at his family's glass company in Illinois. It was at Illinois Glass Company where Levis was instrumental in helping to design the glass backboard, the predecessor to the plexi-glass backboards used in basketball today.

Levis also coached baseball at Indiana University during the 1920, 1921 and 1922 seasons.

Levis was born in Madison, Wisconsin. He died on October 8, 1980, at Columbia Hospital in Milwaukee.

Head coaching record

Basketball

References

Additional sources

External links
 

1894 births
1980 deaths
All-American college men's basketball players
American men's basketball players
Baseball players from Wisconsin
Basketball coaches from Wisconsin
Basketball players from Wisconsin
Forwards (basketball)
College men's basketball head coaches in the United States
Indiana Hoosiers baseball coaches
Indiana Hoosiers men's basketball coaches
Sportspeople from Madison, Wisconsin
Wisconsin Badgers baseball players
Wisconsin Badgers men's basketball players